This is a list of comic books featuring Superman and related characters.

Ongoing titles featuring Superman in a starring role

Action Comics
Action Comics began in 1938. Action Comics #1 featured the introduction of Superman. Thirteen Annuals have also been published between 1987 and 2011 (1987–1997 and 2007–2011). Issue #0 (October 1994) was published between issues #703 and 704 during the Zero Hour: Crisis in Time! crossover event and issue #1,000,000 (November 1998) was published between #748 and 749 during the "DC One Million" crossover event. In all, 906 issues (904 regulars, plus one #0 issue and one #1,000,000 issue) of Action Comics were published before The New 52'''s relaunch of the title in September 2011. Action Comics (vol. 2) started at #1 and ended in issue #52 in May 2016, with three Annuals. In June 2016, DC again relaunched the title with DC Rebirth. Action Comics resumed the classic numbering beginning with issue #957.

Batman/Superman: World's Finest

An ongoing comic titled Batman/Superman: World's Finest, written by Mark Waid, was launched in 2022. The story was described as taking place a few years before present time, when Dick Grayson was still Robin and was 17–18 years old.

SupermanSuperman ran from 1939 to 1986 for 423 issues, with 12 Annuals published between 1960–1986 (1960–1964 and 1983–1986). In 1986, this series was retitled The Adventures of Superman, continuing with the same numbering from 1987 to 2006 (issue #424-649), with nine Annuals also published. Superman (vol. 2) ran concurrently, with issues #1-226, 12 Annuals and one Special. Starting with #650, the first series was retitled Superman in 2006 after the events of the Infinite Crisis miniseries. The Annuals also continued after the retitling, starting with Annual (vol. 2) #13 in November 2007. 716 issues (714 regular issues, plus one #0 issue (October 1994) and one #1,000,000 issue (November 1998)) of Superman were published before The New 52's relaunch of the title in September 2011. Superman (vol. 3), starting at #1, ran from 2011 to 2016 with 52 issues and three Annuals. In DC Rebirth, Superman (vol. 4) was released with issue #1 from 2016 to 2018 with 48 issues, one Annual, one Special and a DC Rebirth one-shot issue. Superman (vol. 5) starting at issue #1, began publication in July 2018 and ended in June 2021 with issue #32. The series was replaced by Superman: Son of Kal-El, a new comic book series which followed the adventures of Jon Kent, the son of Superman.

Formerly published titles
Superman titles
These were titles in which Superman starred:
 The Adventures of Superman was originally (vol. 1) of Superman. It ran titled as The Adventures of... from 1987 to 2006, issues #424 to 649, with a #0 issue (October 1994) published between issues #516 and 517 during the Zero Hour: Crisis in Time! crossover event and a #1,000,000 issue (November 1998) published between issues #562 and 563 during the "DC One Million" crossover event. Issue #650 was retitled back to Superman, with (vol. 2) of Superman being cancelled at issue #226. Nine Annuals were also published using The Adventures of Superman title from 1987 to 1997. After the retitling, the Annuals continued the numbering from (vol. 1) of Superman Annual with Annual #13 in November 2007.
 Superman (vol. 2) ran from 1987 to 2006, ending with issue #226, and was first launched after John Byrne revamped Superman. The series included a #0 issue (October 1994) published between issues #93 and 94 during the Zero Hour: Crisis in Time! crossover event and a #1,000,000 issue (November 1998) published between issues #139 and 140 during the "DC One Million" crossover event. Twelve Annuals were also published between 1987 and 2000 and one Special was also published in 1992.
 Superman: The Man of Steel has a title similar to the miniseries The Man of Steel. However, The Man of Steel was printed in 1986, whereas this series was printed from 1991 to 2003, ending at issue #134. The series included a #0 issue (October 1994) published between issues #37 and 38 during the Zero Hour: Crisis in Time! crossover event and a #1,000,000 issue (November 1998) published between issues #83 and 84 during the "DC One Million" crossover event. Six Annuals were also published between 1992 and 1997. Once this series began, there was a new Superman book each week for every month, except for four weeks out of the year.
 Superman: The Man of Tomorrow was a series published from summer 1995 to fall 1999, ending at issue #15. The series filled in the four weeks of the year that an issue of Action Comics, The Adventures of Superman, Superman (vol. 2) and Superman: The Man of Steel were not published as a fifth week to give 52 weeks (i.e., one year) of Superman stories. The series included a #1,000,000 issue (November 1998) being published between issues #11 and 12 during the "DC One Million" crossover event. As this was a quarterly book, no additional Annuals or Specials were published using this title.
 Superman/Batman was a series featuring DC's two most iconic characters and published from August 2003 until August 2011. This series is not firmly set in continuity, but has been a launching point for several large storylines, including the downfall of Lex Luthor as President of the United States and the return of Kara Zor-El as Supergirl from Krypton. 87 issues and five Annuals were published before the title was cancelled in August 2011 by The New 52 relaunch.
 Superman Confidential was a series published from November 2006 to April 2008, ending at issue #14. The series focused on the telling of early Superman moments.
 Smallville Season 11 - Based on the CW TV series Smallville, this book, which began in 2012 and ended in 2014, picks up six months after the final episode of the series left off with the continuing story of Superman, his friends and his enemies. Written by Bryan Q. Miller, who also served as executive story editor for the television series, Smallville Season 11 is a digital first title that began, like most other digital titles, by releasing three chapters a month digitally, then a print collection; however, it was later decided the four weeks of a month would now play host to a new series of shorter side stories that run parallel to the main story at the time. These parallel story arcs are collected in print as part of the Smallville Season 11 Specials, which run periodically.
 Superman Unchained - Beginning in June 2013, the 12-issue series was the highly anticipated series by Batman, Swamp Thing and American Vampire writer Scott Snyder and artist and DC co-publisher Jim Lee.
 The Adventures of Superman - Unrelated to the previous The Adventures of Superman title, this book, which began in 2013 and ended in 2014, was a three-times-a-month digital comic anthology of non-canonical Superman stories by rotating creative teams. The print edition collected three digital chapters a month.
 Batman/Superman began publication in June 2013. The series is written by Greg Pak and illustrated by Jae Lee. The series features the first encounter between the two heroes as they exist in The New 52. The first arc is set before the formation of the Justice League in the team's own book. The series concluded in May 2016 with issue #32. A second Batman/Superman series was released in August 2019.
 Superman/Wonder Woman written by Charles Soule and drawn by Tony Daniel with participation of others artists like Jack Herbert, explores the relationship between Superman and Wonder Woman. The series launched in October 2013 and was cancelled in May 2016 with issue #29.
 Superman: Lois and Clark is an eight-issue comic book miniseries debuting in October 2015. The series is a spin-off and follow-up to the Superman: Convergence miniseries, which featured a Pre-Flashpoint married Superman and Lois Lane. It was written by writer Dan Jurgens, with art by Lee Weeks, and set nine years after the Convergence event. The series focuses on Superman and his family, including his wife Lois Lane and their 9-year-old son (born in the Convergence event) Jonathan Samuel Kent, living in the Post-Flashpoint DC Universe.

Superboy and Supergirl titles
 Superboy – Ran from March/April 1949 through August 1977 for 230 issues and one Annual.
 Superboy and the Legion of Super-Heroes – The original Superboy series was renamed to this title in 1977. It ran from September 1977 through December 1979 with issues #231-258. The series was renamed Legion of Super-Heroes (vol. 2) with issues #259-313, which ran from January 1980 to July 1984.
 The New Adventures of Superboy – Ran from January 1980 through June 1984 for a total of 54 issues.
 Superboy: The Comic Book – This second Superboy series was based on the live action series that ran on television. The series was renamed The Adventures of Superboy beginning with issue #11. In all, the series ran from February 1990 through February 1992 with 22 issues.
 Superboy (vol. 3) – The third Superboy series ran from February 1994 through July 2002 with 100 issues, four Annuals, a #1,000,000 issue and a two-issue miniseries titled Superboy Plus/The Power of Shazam! #1 and Superboy Plus/Slither #2. The series featured Conner Kent (Kon-El), the clone of Superman and Lex Luthor.
 Supergirl – Ran from November 1972 through September/October 1974 with 10 issues. The series featured Kara Zor-El, Superman's cousin from Krypton.
 The Daring New Adventures of Supergirl - This series ran from November 1982 through November 1983 with 13 issues.
 Supergirl (vol. 2) – Originally The Daring New Adventures of Supergirl, this series ran from December 1983 through September 1984 with 10 issues plus a movie adaptation.
 Supergirl (vol. 3) – A four-issue miniseries, running from February through May 1994, that detailed the adventures of the Matrix after learning the truth about Lex Luthor.
 Supergirl (vol. 4) – Ran from September 1996 through May 2003 with 82 issues, two Annuals and a one-shot issue titled Supergirl Plus/The Power of Shazam! #1. The series featured the Matrix bonding with Linda Danvers and the Earth Born Angel series. It ended with the "Many Happy Returns" story arc.
 More Fun Comics – Issue #101 (January/February 1945) of this series featured the debut and earliest adventures of Superboy.
 Superboy and the Ravers – Ran from September 1996 through March 1998 with 19 issues. The series featured Superboy (Kon-El) and a team of superheroes.
 Super Sons – The series was launched in February 2017 and ended in May 2018 with 16 issues and one Annual. It focuses on Damian Wayne and Jonathan Kent, the sons of Batman and Superman, as Robin and Superboy, written by Peter J. Tomasi with art by Jorge Jimenez.
 Adventures of the Super Sons – A 12-issue miniseries which served as a continuation of the Super Sons series. The first issue was released in August 2018.

Justice League/crossover titles
 DC Comics Presents – Ran from July/August 1978 through September 1986 with 97 issues and four Annuals. The series was a monthly title featuring Superman teaming up with another DC character or group of characters in every issue. It was similar to the Batman team-up title The Brave and the Bold.
 A similar Superman team-up format was done later in Action Comics #584-600 (January 1987–May 1988) and Action Comics Annual #1 (1987).
 JLA – Ran from January 1997 through April 2006 with 127 issues and four Annuals.
 Justice League Adventures – Ran from January 2002 through October 2004 with 34 issues.
 JLA Classified – Ran from January 2005 through March 2008 with 54 issues.
 Justice League Unlimited – Ran from November 2004 through June 2008 with 46 issues. A continuation of Justice League Adventures, picking up where that series left off.
 World's Finest Comics – Originally told separate Superman and Batman stories in the 1940s, it then featured Superman/Batman team-ups in each issue from July 1954 with issue #71 through its cancellation in January 1986 with issue #323.
 Adventure Comics – Featured various Superman supporting characters from the 1940s through the 1980s, including Superboy, Supergirl, the Legion of Super-Heroes and Bizarro.

Other titles
 Superman's Girl Friend, Lois Lane – Ran from March/April 1958 through September/October 1974 with 137 issues and two Annuals. The series starred Lois Lane.
 Superman's Pal Jimmy Olsen – Ran from September/October 1954 through February/March 1974 with 163 issues. The series starred Jimmy Olsen.
 The Superman Family – Ran from April/May 1974 through September 1982 with 59 issues (numbered #164-222). The series was an anthology title that continued from the numbering of Superman's Pal Jimmy Olsen and was combined with tales of Supergirl and Lois Lane.
 Superman Adventures - Based on, and connected with, the 1990s animated TV series produced by Paul Dini and Bruce Timm.
 Steel (vol. 2) – Ran from February 1994 through July 1998 with 53 issues and two Annuals. This was a solo series that continued the adventures of Steel (John Henry Irons).
 Infinity, Inc. (vol. 2) – Ran from November 2007 through October 2008 with 12 issues. The series featured a new team of Infinity Inc. and starred Steel (John Henry Irons).
 Krypto the Superdog – A six-issue miniseries based on the animated TV series of the same name that ran from November 2007 to April 2008.
 Legion of Super Heroes in the 31st Century - Ran for 20 issues from June 2007 to January 2009. The series was based on the animated TV series Legion of Super-Heroes.
 Superman Family Adventures - Ran for 12 issues from July 2012 to June 2013, written by Art Baltazar and Franco Aureliani and drawn by Baltazar, who had previously worked together on Tiny Titans.

Other published titles
 Superman: The Wedding Album (December 1996)
 DC Comics Presents: Superman #1 (October 2004; a tribute to Julius "Julie" Schwartz)

Graphic novels
 Superman: End of the Century (2000), TPB: , HC: 
 Son of Superman (2000), TPB: , HC: 
 Superman: Infinite City (2005), TPB: , HC: 

Miniseries
 World of Krypton (1979) – The first comic book miniseries of them all, written by Paul Kupperberg with pencils by Howard Chaykin.
 The Krypton Chronicles (1981) - Written by E. Nelson Bridwell with art by Curt Swan, the three-issue miniseries covers Superman's Kryptonian ancestors.
 The Phantom Zone (1982) – A Steve Gerber miniseries that was controversial for depicting violence against the Metropolis police. The series took a hard look at the ethics of the Phantom Zone, released its villains and centered around Qwex-Ull, a framed Kryptonian who Superman was forced to release in Superman #157, 20 years earlier.
 Superman: The Secret Years (1985) – Covers the Pre-Crisis Superman's years in college.
 The Man of Steel (1986) – Superman's Post-Crisis origin and early history.
 The World of Krypton (1987) - Four-issue miniseries.
 The World of Smallville (1988) - Four-issue miniseries.
 The World of Metropolis (1988) - Four-issue miniseries.
 Superman and Batman: World's Finest (1990) - Three-issue prestige format miniseries featuring Superman and Batman teaming up to battle Lex Luthor and the Joker.
 Superman/Doomsday: Hunter/Prey (1994)
 Superman for All Seasons (1998)
 Superman: The Doomsday Wars (1998–1999)
 Superman: The Dark Side (1998)
 Batman and Superman: World's Finest (1999) - 10-issue miniseries.
 The Kingdom (1999)
 Superman's Nemesis: Lex Luthor (1999)
 Batman/Superman/Wonder Woman: Trinity (2003)
 Superman: Metropolis (2003–2004)
 Superman: Birthright (2003–2004) – A revised take on Superman's origin and early history.
 Superman: Secret Identity (2004) – Four-issue miniseries. TPB: 
 Superman: Strength (2005)
 Superman/Shazam: First Thunder (2005–2006)
 All-Star Superman (2006–2008) – This series did not follow the main continuity of the DC Universe, but was created to tell reinterpreted stories of Superman and his cast of characters (the other such title published by DC was the unfinished All Star Batman and Robin the Boy Wonder). This series was a miniseries running for 12 issues and published irregularly from 2006 to 2008, but may include additional one-shots or miniseries in the future.
 Final Crisis: Superman Beyond (2008–2009) – Two-issue miniseries that occurred during the Final Crisis crossover event.
 Superman & Batman vs. Vampires & Werewolves (2008-2009) – Six-issue miniseries.
 Superman: Secret Origin (2010)
 DC Comics Presents: Superman (2010) – Four-issue miniseries.
 Superman: Year One (2019)
 Superman: Red and Blue (2021) - Six-issue anthology miniseries with only red and blue colors used for internal coloring.

One-shots
 Superman vs. Muhammad Ali (1978)
 The Computers that Saved Metropolis (1980) - Free giveaway through Radio Shack.
 Victory By Computer (1981) - Free giveaway through Radio Shack.
 The Computer Masters of Metropolis (1982) - Free giveaway through Radio Shack.
 Superman Meets the Quik Bunny (1987) - Free giveaway through Nestlé.
 Superman: A Tale of Five Cities (1990)
 Superman: The Earth Stealers (1988)
 The Superman Gallery #1 (1993)
 Supergirl and Team Luthor #1 (1993)
 Superman: Under a Yellow Sun (1994)
 Superman: Man of Steel - Target Superman (1995) - Kenner exclusive
 Superman: Man of Steel - Doomsday is Coming! (1995) - Kenner exclusive
 Superman: Man of Steel - Superman and Batman: Doom Link (1995) - Kenner exclusive
 Superman: Man of Steel - Doomsday is Coming (1995) 
 Superman: The Man of Steel Gallery (1995)
 Superman/Toyman (1996)
 Superman Plus/Legion of Super-Heroes #1 (1997)
 The Superman (Tangent Comics, 1998)
 Superman: Distant Fires (1998)
 Superman: Peace on Earth (1998)
 Superman: Save the Planet (1998)
 Superman: Transformed! (1998)
 JLA: Superpower (1999)
 Superman Forever (1998)
 Superman: King of the World (1999)
 Team Superman (1999)
 Superman: For the Animals (2000)
 Green Lantern/Superman: Legends of the Green Flame (2000)Mann and Superman (2000)
 Millennium Edition: Action Comics #1 (2000)
 Millennium Edition: The Man of Steel #1 (2000)
 Sins of Youth: Superman, Jr. and Superboy, Sr. (2000)
 Superman and Batman: World's Funnest (2000)
 Superman Y2K (2000)
 Superman: Emperor Joker (2000)
 Superman: Eradication (2000)
 Superman: Last God of Krypton (2000)
 Superman: Panic in the Sky (2000)
 Superman: Where Is Thy Sting (2001)
 Superman: Lex 2000 (2001)
 DC 1st: Flash/Superman (2002)
 DC 1st: Superman/Lobo (2002)
 Superman: Day of Doom (2002)
 Superman: The 10-Cent Adventure (2003)
 Superman versus Darkseid: Apokolips Now! (2003)
 Superman Beyond (2011)
 Man and Superman 100-Page Super Spectacular (2019)

Intercompany crossovers
 Marvel Comics
 Superman vs. The Amazing Spider-Man (1976)
 Superman and Spider-Man (1981) (published in Marvel Treasury Edition #28, titled "Spider-Man and Superman: The Heroes and the Holocaust!") 
 DC versus Marvel Comics/Marvel Comics versus DC #1-4 (1996)
 Super-Soldier #1 (Amalgam Comics 1996)
 DC/Marvel: All Access #1-4 (1996)
 Silver Surfer/Superman #1 (1997)
 Unlimited Access #1-4 (1997-1998)
 Super-Soldier: Man of War #1 (Amalgam Comics 1997)
 The Incredible Hulk vs. Superman #1 (1999)
 Superman/Fantastic Four: The Infinite Destruction (1999)
 JLA/Avengers/Avengers/JLA #1-4 (2003)
 Mattel Toys
 Superman and the Masters of the Universe (published as a special insert in DC Comics Presents #47 (1982))
 Milestone Comics
 Worlds Collide published in
 Worlds Collide #1
 Superman: The Man of Steel #35-36
 Hardware #17-18
 Superboy #6-7
 Icon #15-16
 Steel #6-7
 Blood Syndicate #16-17
 Static #14
 Dark Horse Comics
 Superman/Aliens #1-3 (1995)
 The Superman/Madman Hullabaloo! #1-3 (1996)
 Superman vs. The Terminator: Death to the Future #1-4 (2000)
 Superman vs. Predator #1-3 (2000)
 Superman/Tarzan: Sons of the Jungle #1-3 (2001)
 Superman/Aliens 2: God War #1-4 (2002)
 Superman and Batman versus Aliens and Predator #1-2 (2007)
 Image Comics
 Superman/The Savage Dragon: Metropolis (1999)
 Superman/The Savage Dragon: Chicago (2002)
 Warner Bros/Looney Tunes Comics
 Superman & Bugs Bunny #1-4 (2000)
 Wildstorm Comics
 Wild Times: Wetworks #1, features Superman (2000)
 Superman/Gen¹³ #1-3 (2000)
 Planetary/JLA: Terra Occulta (2003)
 Superman/Thundercats (2004)
 Superman/Mr. Majestic published in:
 Action Comics #811 (2004) 
 The Adventures of Superman #624 (2004)
 Superman (vol. 2) #201 (2004)
 Majestic #1 (2005)
 Top Cow Comics
 JLA/Witchblade (2000)
 The Darkness/Superman #1-2 (2005)
 JLA/Cyberforce (2005)
 Teshkeel Comics
 JLA/The 99 #1-6 (2010)

Elseworlds
All stories are one-shots unless otherwise noted:
 Superman: Speeding Bullets (1993)
 Superman: At Earth's End (1995)
 Superman: Kal (1995)
 Kingdom Come (1996) - Four-issue miniseries.
 Superman's Metropolis (1996) - The first story of a trilogy, followed by Batman: Nosferatu (1999) and Wonder Woman: The Blue Amazon (2003), two more Elseworlds stories.
 Superman: War of the Worlds (1998)
 The Superman Monster (1999) - The sequel to Batman: Two Faces #1 (November 1998), another Elseworlds story.
 Superman & Batman: Generations (1999) - Four-issue miniseries.
 Superman & Batman: Generations 2 (2001) - Four-issue miniseries.
 Superman & Batman: Generations 3 (2003-2004) - Twelve-issue miniseries.
 Superman: Last Son of Earth (2000) - Two-issue miniseries.
 Superman: Last Stand on Krypton (2003) - The sequel to Superman: Last Son of Earth.
 Superman: Red Son (2003) – Three-issue miniseries. HC: , TPB: 
 Superman: True Brit (2004) – HC: , TPB: 

Secret Files and Origins
 Superman Secret Files and Origins #1-2 (1998–1999)
 Team Superman Secret Files and Origins #1 (1998)
 Superman Villains Secret Files and Origins #1 (1998)
 Superman: Metropolis Secret Files and Origins #1 (2000)
 President Luthor Secret Files and Origins #1 (2001)
 Superman: Our Worlds at War Secret Files and Origins #1 (2001)
 Superman/Batman Secret Files and Origins 2003 (2003)
 Superman Secret Files and Origins 2004 (2004)
 Superman Secret Files and Origins 2005 (2005)
 Superman Secret Files and Origins 2009 #1 (2009)

Collected editions
Superman newspaper comic strip editions

DC Archive Editions
All DC Archive Editions are available only in hardcover and are printed on high quality archival paper.

The Superman Chronicles
This series plans to reprint every Superman adventure, in color, in chronological order and in affordable trade paperbacks.

Showcase Presents
All Showcase Presents editions are large (over 500 pages) softcover-only and black-and-white only reprints.

The Greatest Stories Ever Told
These two series reprint the "best" stories of all time in hardcover or trade paperbacks.

Decade editions
This series reprints the "best" stories of each decade in trade paperbacks.

Silver Age and Bronze Age Superman editions
The following collected editions are stories that predominately ran through the Silver Age and Bronze Age periods of the Superman family.

Modern Superman
The following collected editions are stories that run through the "contemporary" books of the Superman family. These stories are from comic books that are still being published and are, in a sense, ongoing. They are printed here in the chronology of the story lines, rather than the publication dates of either the original comics or collections.

The New 52
Post-Flashpoint Superman as part of DC's The New 52''.

DC Omnibuses

Superman/Batman
This series has been collected in the following hardcovers and trade paperbacks.

See also
 List of Batman comics
 List of Spider-Man titles
 Publication history of Superman
 Publication history of Wonder Woman

References

 
Lists of comics by character
Lists of comics by DC Comics
Lists of comic book titles